Cyberspace is the fourth album by the composer Eloy Fritsch.

AllMusic's Cesar Lanzarini described the record as "overflowing with powerful electronic compositions; rich, melodic themes; and dynamic musical movements".

Track listing
 "Cyberspace" – 4:31
 "Lost Paradise" – 8:50
 "Beyond the Ocean Waves" – 5:52
 "Inside the Heart of Universe" – 4:43
 "Malacara Canyon" – 6:34
 "Symphony of Peace" – 6:39
 "Parallel Dimension" – 6:35
 "Callisto" – 5:20
 "Lake of Peace (Movement 1 & 2)" – 11:05
 "The Arrival of Spaceship" – 3:08
 "Tales of the Ancient Sphinz" – 4:23
 "Towards to Sky" – 5:02

Personnel 
Eloy Fritsch – Synthesizer, Arranger, Keyboards, Programming, Wind, Producer, Korg Synthesizer, Sequencing, Cover Design, Mini Moog, Computer Editing, Ensoniq, Korg M1, Roland Synthesizer, Roland Juno 6, Roland JD800
Marcos Abreu – Mastering
Carlos Valdes Machado – Photography
Lauren Veronese – Photography

References

2000 albums
Eloy Fritsch albums